Zhoujiazhuang station is a subway station on Line 17 of the Beijing Subway. The station opened on December 31, 2021.

Platform Layout
The station has an underground island platform.

Exits
There are 4 exits, lettered A, B, C and D. Exits A and C are accessible via elevators.

References

Beijing Subway stations in Chaoyang District
Railway stations in China opened in 2021